New High is an album by guitarist Larry Coryell which was recorded in 1999 and released on the HighNote label the following year.

Reception

In his review on Allmusic, Stewart Mason states "A better-than-average standards date, Larry Coryell's New High finds the guitarist in a supportive small-combo setting, playing a solid mix of some well-chosen standards and a fine pair of originals. ... Larry Coryell has taken some heat from jazz purists for his too-regular forays into easy listening jazz-pop, but New High is a more-than-respectable piece of solid post-bop". In JazzTimes, Jim Ferguson called it " an album that is beautifully played and recorded" noting "the opening moments of this most recent album leave little doubt that he's in a blowing, straightahead frame of mind and in command of an expert combo".

Track listing 
All compositions by Larry Coryell except where noted
 "Bags' Groove" (Milt Jackson) – 8:02
 "Like Sonny" (John Coltrane) – 5:46
 "Funereal" – 5:04
 "Ursula" (Harold Land) – 5:48
 "John Charles" (Ronnie Mathews) – 7:53
 "Spiral Staircase" (Mark Sherman) – 6:49
 "Old Folks" (Willard Robison, Dedette Lee Hill) – 5:25
 "New High" – 5:15

Personnel 
Larry Coryell – guitar
 Shunzo Ono – trumpet (tracks 1, 3, 7 & 8)
Ronnie Mathews – piano (tracks 1–6 & 8)
Mark Sherman – vibraphone (tracks 1, 3, 6 & 8)
Buster Williams – bass (tracks 1–6 & 8)
Yoron Israel – drums (tracks 1–6 & 8)

References 

Larry Coryell albums
2000 albums
HighNote Records albums
Albums recorded at Van Gelder Studio